The Institut international du commerce et du développement (also called ICD Business School) is a French business school founded in 1980. It is located in Paris and Toulouse.

Description
The school is accredited by the French State and was ranked among the top 30 French post-baccalaureate business schools in 2016.

ICD Business School  is a member of the French Federation of Grande Ecole Business Schools' institution it offers a range of programmes from undergraduate Bachelors-level courses to specialised Masters-level courses.

Departments
Sales & Marketing
Strategy, Finance & Business Development
Information & Operations Management
Economics, Law & International Business
Personal Development
Cultures & Humanities

References

External links
 ICD Business School

Business schools in France
Education in Paris
Education in Toulouse
Educational institutions established in 1980